In mathematics, two-center bipolar coordinates is a coordinate system based on two coordinates which give distances from two fixed centers  and . This system is very useful in some scientific applications (e.g. calculating the electric field of a dipole on a plane).

Transformation to Cartesian coordinates

Transformation to polar coordinates
When x > 0, the transformation to polar coordinates from two-center bipolar coordinates is

 
where  is the distance between the poles (coordinate system centers).

Applications
Polar plotters use two-center bipolar coordinates to describe the drawing paths required to draw a target image.

See also
 Bipolar coordinates
Biangular coordinates
Lemniscate of Bernoulli
Oval of Cassini
Cartesian oval
Ellipse

References

Two-center bipolar coordinates